The Wasserstein Public Interest Fellows Program recognizes exemplary members of the bar who engage in public service. The program, founded in 1990 defines public service as "law-related work for governmental agencies, legal services providers, prosecutors, public defenders, private public interest law firms, nonprofit organizations and international organizations that provide legal assistance, conduct research, or engage in other activities aimed at advancing the common good."  Academics and judges are ineligible for nomination (although they may go on to those roles). Fellows are invited to Harvard Law School to interact with students.

Shara L. Aranoff
Spencer Boyer
Denise J. Casper United States District Judge Massachusetts
Brian Concannon
Paul J. Fishman  United States Attorney for the District of New Jersey
Andrew Fois
Terry Goddard
Edmund V. Ludwig Federal District Judge
John A. Powell 
Pierre-Richard Prosper
Jonathan Rapping a 2014 recipient of the MacArthur "Genius" Award
Rod Rosenstein  Deputy Attorney General of the United States
Reggie Shuford
James E. Tierney
Leslie Winner

See also
 List of awards for contributions to society

References

 
Awards established in 1990
Wasserstein Fellowship